Patrizio is an Italian male personal name. It is the Italian form of Patrick.

 Patrizio Bertelli (born 1946), Italian businessman
 Patrizio Bianchi (born 1952), Italian economist and politician
 Patrizio Buanne (born 1978), Italian baritone
 Patrizio Di Renzo (born 1971), Swiss photographer
  (born 1989), German-Italian footballer
 Patrizio Gambirasio (born 1961), Italian cyclist
 Patrizio Oliva (born 1959), Italian boxer

Italian masculine given names